Little Hulton is an area in the City of Salford, Greater Manchester, England,  south of Bolton,  northwest of Salford, and  northwest of Manchester. Within the boundaries of the historic county of Lancashire, Little Hulton is bordered by Farnworth to the north, Walkden to the east and Tyldesley to the south.

In 2014, it had a population of 13,469.

History
The ancient district of Hulton containing three townships, Over Hulton, Middle Hulton and Little Hulton, was recorded as Helghtun and Hulton in 1235, Hilton in 1278 and 1292, and Hulton in 1292, although Hilton was still used until the 17th century.  
Historically Little Hulton was a village in the ancient Deane parish with a chapel, sometimes called Peel Chapel. The chief manor was held by the Hultons at Hulton Park in Over Hulton.

Wharton was a subordinate manor that gave its name to the family living there. Later it was owned by the Asshetons of Great Lever and after that the Morts. It was sold to Bridgewater Collieries. Wharton Hall was a two-storey farmhouse built of brick, timber and plaster.

In the 13th century Peel or Wicheves, another district in the township, was owned by the Hultons who sold it to the Tyldesleys. Later it was owned by Edmund Fleetwood of Rossall who sold it to the Morts. Joseph Yates of Manchester bought it in the 18th century and his descendants sold it to colliery owner, Ellis Fletcher of Clifton. Peel Hall was reputedly built in 1840 by Matthew Fletcher, from the designs of Sir Charles Barry. It stood on the site of an older stone-built hall which had a moat. Peel Hall became a sanatorium to treat tuberculosis and subsequently a geriatric hospital until it closed in 1990. It was sold to a development company for refurbishment but, despite being a Grade II listed building, was vandalised, became dangerous and was demolished in the mid-1990s. Parts of the property still remain including the ice house which is also a grade II listed building.

Kenyon Peel Hall, was owned by Alexander Rigby in 1600 and he gave it to his son George. It passed to Roger Kenyon of Parkhead through marriage. It was a large timber, stone and brick house which was built in the late 16th century and enlarged in 1617. The house was demolished and the site is occupied by a modern housing estate. Kenyon Peel Hall was about a quarter of a mile south of the ancient highway from Manchester to Bolton.

Coal mining and weaving were the major occupations in the mid 19th century.

In 1870 the London and North Western Railway opened a line from Roe Green on the Eccles, Tyldesley and Wigan Railway to serve collieries at Little Hulton and in 1874 an extension to Bolton was opened with passenger services commencing in 1875. The line closed in 1965 and is now an urban cycleway. A ten feet wide Roman road was found when the railway was being cut.

Coal mining and Cutacre
Little Hulton was extensively mined from the mid-19th century. Its collieries included Madam's Wood Pits, Brackley, Wharton Hall, Ashton's Field and Peel Hall and most were served by mineral railways. Mine spoil was deposited around the early collieries but in the 20th century the Cutacre tip developed in the valley of the Cutacre Clough and was the dumping ground for mine waste from Brackley and neighbouring Mosley Common Collieries.

The National Coal Board Central Workshops, commonly known as 'Walkden Yard', south of Walkden High Street, close to the Ellesmere Colliery, was partly in Little Hulton. The workshops were built in 1878 by the Bridgewater Collieries as a central works depot providing engineering services for its collieries and the locomotives used on its colliery railway system. It closed as a British Coal workshop in 1986 and is now the site of a housing estate.

UK Coal was granted planning permission to surface mine 900,000 tonnes of coal and rework the Cutacre spoil tip in 2001. The operation was expected to last for four years and began in 2006. UK Coal and Bolton Council promoted the Middle Hulton portion of Cutacre through the Local Development Framework process and identified it as a key strategic site for development.

20th century
Before 1949 Little Hulton was a village of around 8,000 people. The land was developed into council housing overspill estates by Worsley Urban District Council to accommodate residents moved there from post-war slum clearance areas. By the end of 1956 over a thousand families had moved to the overspill estate being built at Little Hulton and by 1962 3,060 houses had been built. Little Hulton aimed to create a suburb that would improve the standard of living and create private space, greenspace and a sense of community for the new residents.

The housing estate to the northwest, along the Wigan road, is known as Greenheys. Here the 1894 Ordnance Survey map shows only Greenhey's House and a few roadside houses.

Governance
Historically in the hundred of Salford in Lancashire, until the 19th century, Little Hulton was a township and chapelry in the ecclesiastical parish of Deane. In 1837 Little Hulton along with neighbouring townships (or civil parishes) became part of the Bolton Poor Law Union which took responsibility for the administration and funding of the Poor Law in that area. In 1872 a Local board of health was established for the township, and in 1894 Little Hulton Urban District was created. It was abolished in 1933 and merged into Worsley Urban District

Little Hulton's MP is Barbara Keeley who won the Worsley parliamentary seat for Labour at the 2005 General Election. Since 2010 Little Hulton has been represented under the Worsley and Eccles South parliamentary seat.

Since 1974 Little Hulton has been an electoral ward of the City of Salford. The Little Hulton ward has three elected councillors. In April 2017 the councillors are: Colette Weir, Kate Lewis, and Rob Sharpe, all from the Labour Party.

Geography

The main Manchester to Chorley road, the A6, crosses the town. Much of the area was pasture and meadow on good soil. Sandstone was quarried at Peel Quarry and the underlying rocks are the coal measures of the Manchester Coalfield.

Demography

Education

Religion

 
The old Wharton Chapel had its origins in the Act of Uniformity 1662 which led to the Great Ejection of clergy. Reverend James Wood (the elder) was ejected from Atherton Chapel but continued to hold services in private houses, including that of the Mort family at Wharton Hall. A Presbyterian church was rebuilt in 1723 and after 1755 used by different denominations until it was restored to the Presbyterians in 1860. A new church was built in 1901.

Peel Chapel, built by the Yates family, was consecrated in 1760 as a chapelry in the Parish of Deane. It stood immediately north of the new church, above the vaults of the Kenyon and Fletcher families. In March 1874 Peel became a parish and the foundation stone for St Paul's Church was laid by Lord Kenyon in August 1874. The church, built in sandstone from Peel Quarry, was consecrated in December 1876. The church is a Grade II listed building. A window made of painted and fired porcelain over the font at St Paul's is from the old Peel Chapel.

The Roman Catholic parish of St Edmund's comprises St Edmund's Church built in 1899 and Our Lady and Lancashire Martyrs built in 1959. St Joseph's Church closed on 24 October 2010.

Several chapels were built for Methodist congregations including a Wesleyan Methodist church opened in 1878 at a cost of £700.
Other places of worship include the Gospel Hall, a Redeemed Christian Church of God, a United Reformed Church and Kingdom Hall of Jehovah's Witnesses.

Sport and organisations
Little Hulton Cricket and Bowling Club at the Old Vicarage is affiliated to the Bolton and District Cricket Association. Little Hulton Reds Amateur Rugby League Football Club is based at Peel Park.

The Air Cadet Organisation's 1099 (Worsley) Squadron, Air Training Corps meets at Highfield Road.

Little Hulton and Walkden Community Committee meets bi-monthly and works with Salford City Council and produces an annual action plan to improve the quality of life and provide activities. The library is on Longshaw Drive.

Public services
Little Hulton is policed by the Greater Manchester Police force from Little Hulton Police Station. The statutory emergency fire and rescue service is provided by the Greater Manchester Fire and Rescue Service, from fire stations in Salford, Broughton, Agecroft in Pendlebury, Eccles and Irlam. Hospital services are provided by the Salford Royal NHS Foundation Trust, which provides an Accident and Emergency service at Salford Royal.

Waste management is co-ordinated by Greater Manchester Waste Disposal Authority. Little Hulton's Distribution Network Operator for electricity is Electricity North West. United Utilities manage Little Hulton's drinking and waste water.

Notable people

 Mark Barry – singer in pop group BBMak
 Christopher Eccleston – actor, star of Doctor Who, also appeared in the films 28 Days Later, Gone in 60 Seconds, Let Him Have It and Shallow Grave
 Jimmy Hampson – former professional footballer and Blackpool's record goalscorer
 George Maddison (1902–1959) – professional footballer with Tottenham Hotspur and Hull City
 James Roscoe (1820–1890) - locomotive engineer and colliery owner
 Shelley Holroyd – Olympic Javelin Thrower 1996 Olympic Games
 Paul Ryder – bass guitarist of alternative rock group Happy Mondays
 Shaun Ryder – lead singer of Happy Mondays
 Peter Hook - bass player in New Order

See also

 Listed buildings in Worsley

References
Notes

Bibliography

External links

GENUKI: Little Hulton, Lancashire genealogy
Mort Family Wharton Hall
Little Hulton Memories, Local History maintained by Salford Libraries
History of Little Hulton, Local History maintained by Salford Libraries

Areas of Greater Manchester
Geography of Salford